Corton may refer to:

Places 
Corton Formation, a geologic formation in Suffolk and Norfolk, England
Corton, Suffolk, England, a village
Corton, Wiltshire, England, a village
Corton, West Virginia, an unincorporated community

Cuisine 
Corton (wine), a French wine
Corton (meat spread), a French-Canadian meat spread
Corton (restaurant), a New York City restaurant

See also 
 Corton Denham